Mehdi Sharifi (born 16 August 1992), is an Iranian footballer who currently plays for Shahr Khodro F.C. in the Iran Premier League as a forward.

Club career

Zob Ahan
Before going to Sepahan, he was playing for Zob Ahan and he went to rivals Sepahan at age 15.

Sepahan

First years
From 2009 to 2012 he was a member of the Sepahan under-21 football team and became the top goal scorer in the Iran under-21 football league in the 2011–12 season.

He was promoted to the Sepahan first team squad in the summer of 2012. He played in a couple of internal and international friendly matches for Sepahan and scored a couple of goals, like his goal against FK Sarajevo.

2013–14
He made his debut for Sepahan in a match against Rah Ahan on 5 September 2013 and scored his first goal for Sepahan in the Iran Pro League in a 2–1 win over Tractor. His debut in the AFC Champions League coincided with him scoring the only goal for Sepahan in their 3–1 loss against Al-Sadd. Sharifi scored twice in Sepahan's 4–0 win over Al-Sadd in the AFC Champions League.

2014–15
Sharifi extended his contract with Sepahan until 2019 after agreeing on a new contract. He played pre-season friendlies against Arsenal Tula, Gloria Buzău and Fenerbahçe in which he scored three goals. He played his first official game for Sepahan in their 2–0 win over Paykan in the first week of the league. At the next match, Sharifi assisted twice to help Sepahan for their second consecutive 2–0 win, this time against Gostaresh. He scored his first goal of the season in a 3–1 win over Esteghlal on 14 August 2014. On 15 May 2015 Sharifi's two goals in Sepahan's 2–0 win against Saipa won the club the league title for the 2014–15 season.

2015–16
In the first match of the 2015–16 season against Esteghlal Khuzestan Sharifi scored en route to a Sepahan victory. After his good performances with Sepahan, Sharifi drew interest from Austrian champions SK Rapid Wien. Sharifi joined Tractor on loan for a two–year period to complete his conscription.

Persepolis
Sharifi joined Persepolis in June 2018 with a two–year contract.

Club career statistics
Last Update: 3 September 2019  

 Assists

International career

From 2012 to 2013, he was a member of the Iran national under-20 football team, in which he scored one goal in seven matches. On April 12, 2014, he was called up to the Iran national football team by Carlos Queiroz for their South Africa camp. He was later selected in Iran's 30-man provisional squad for the 2014 FIFA World Cup. He made his debut in a friendly match against Belarus on 18 May 2014. However, a month later Sharifi was not included in Iran's squad for the World Cup. He was named in the Iran U23 final list for Incheon 2014.

Honours

Club
Sepahan
Iran Pro League (1): 2014–15
Hazfi Cup (1): 2012–13
Persepolis
Iran Pro League (1): 2018–19
Hazfi Cup (1): 2018–19
Iranian Super Cup (1): 2019

Individual
Iran Pro League Team of the Year: 2014–15
Hazfi Cup top scorer: 2017–18

References

1992 births
Living people
Sportspeople from Isfahan
Iranian footballers
Sepahan S.C. footballers
Tractor S.C. players
Persepolis F.C. players
Sumgayit FK players
Persian Gulf Pro League players
Azerbaijan Premier League players
Iran under-20 international footballers
Footballers at the 2014 Asian Games
Association football forwards
Iran international footballers
Asian Games competitors for Iran
Iranian expatriate footballers
Iranian expatriate sportspeople in Azerbaijan
Expatriate footballers in Azerbaijan